George Dudley Seymour (October 6, 1859 – January 21, 1945) was an American historian, patent attorney, antiquarian, author, and city planner. He was the noted authority and foremost expert on Nathan Hale, the American Revolutionary War hero.

Biography

George Dudley Seymour was born in Bristol, Connecticut, the son of Henry Albert Seymour and Electa Churchill. He practiced patent law in Washington, D.C., and then in New Haven, Connecticut. Seymour was a law graduate of Columbian College in Washington, D.C., and received an honorary Master of Arts degree from Yale University in 1913. He was a member of the Walpole Society, the American Antiquarian Society, the Century Association, the Cosmos Club, and the Acorn Club. Seymour was a former vice president of the American Federation of Arts, a trustee of the Wadsworth Atheneum, and chairman of the State Commission of Sculpture. He was a close friend of William Howard Taft, John Singer Sargent, and Gifford Pinchot, and a cousin of Yale President Charles Seymour.

Seymour extensively researched the life of the patriot Nathan Hale. He led the campaign for the statue of Hale on the Old Campus at Yale, and convinced the federal government to print a Nathan Hale postage stamp in 1925.<ref>"Nathan Hale: The Life and Death of America's First Spy", Phelps, M. William’’, 2014</ref> In 1914, Seymour purchased the Nathan Hale Homestead in Coventry, Connecticut, which he restored and gifted to the Antiquarian & Landmarks Society. Upon his death, Seymour gifted to the United States government the life size bronze statue Captain Nathan Hale by sculptor Bela Lyon Pratt; the statue is located at the south facade of the United States Department of Justice headquarters in Washington, D.C.Seymour was a leading figure in the municipal development of New Haven, and was the city's most fervent proponent of the City Beautiful movement."A Guide to Historic New Haven, Connecticut", Caplan, Colin M., 2007 The City Beautiful influence in New Haven was responsible for a series of formal public buildings, such as the New Haven County Courthouse and the New Haven Free Public Library, with traditional columns and pediments that reinforced the role of the green as a civic center of classical dignity. In 1908, Seymour persuaded Yale to open the Peabody Museum of Natural History and the Yale University Art Gallery to the public on Sunday afternoons.
He died on January 21, 1945, in New Haven, Connecticut and was buried in the Grove Street Cemetery."G. SEYMOUR, EXPERT ON HALE'S LIFE, DIES", The New York Times, January 22, 1945

The George Dudley Seymour Papers, Seymour's collection of correspondence, writings, photographs, research files, and printed material, are housed within the Manuscripts and Archives in Sterling Memorial Library at Yale.

George Dudley Seymour State Park in Middlesex County, Connecticut is named after him.

 See also 

Captain Nathan Hale (Statue)
Nathan Hale Homestead
Elias Sprague House
Strong House (Coventry, Connecticut)

 Bibliography Hale and Wyllys (1933)The Seymour Family (1939)Documentary Life of Nathan Hale (1942)New Haven: A Book Recording the Varied Activities of the Author in his Efforts Over Many Years to Promote the Welfare of the City of his Adoption Since 1883, Together with Some Researches into its Storied Past and Many Illustrations'' (1942)

References

1859 births
1945 deaths
19th-century American lawyers
20th-century American lawyers